The 2018 Women's Africa Cup of Nations (officially known as the Total Women's Africa Cup Of Nations, Ghana 2018) was the 13th edition of the Africa Women Cup of Nations (formerly African Women's Championship), the biennial international football championship organised by the Confederation of African Football (CAF) for the women's national teams of Africa. The tournament was held in Ghana, from 17 November to 1 December 2018.

The tournament also doubled as the African qualifiers to the 2019 FIFA Women's World Cup. The top three teams qualified for the World Cup in France.

Nigeria, the defending champions, won the tournament for their third consecutive and 11th overall Africa Women Cup of Nations title.

Sponsorship
In July 2016, Total has secured an eight-year sponsorship package from the Confederation of African Football (CAF) to support 10 of its principal competitions. Due to this sponsorship, the 2018 Women's Africa Cup of Nations is named "2018 Total Women's Africa Cup of Nations".

Host selection
There were no other associations bidding to host the event other than Ghana. Ghana was de facto awarded the hosting rights on 27 September 2016 and officially in mid December. It is the first time they hosted the women's event.

Following media reports in mid-2018 that Ghana may be stripped of the hosting rights, this topic was discussed at the meeting of the Organising Committee for Women's Football on 12 September, and a final decision not to replace Ghana as host was taken by the CAF Executive Committee at its meeting on 27–28 September, though the Secretariat would continue to closely monitor preparations.

Mascot
The mascot for the 11th Edition of Total Women's African Cup of Nations is called Agrohemaa and it is represented by an eagle. The reason why the eagle is used for the tournament is because of its courage, strength, focus and immortality.

Qualification

Ghana qualified automatically as hosts, while the remaining seven spots were determined by the qualifying rounds played in April and June 2018.

Equatorial Guinea were initially banned from the 2018 Africa Women Cup of Nations, but were reinstated after the ban was lifted in July 2017 at an emergency CAF committee meeting, and were included in the qualifying draw. However, FIFA banned them from qualifying for the 2019 FIFA Women's World Cup, meaning they could not qualify for the World Cup regardless of their performance in the Africa Women Cup of Nations.

Qualified teams
The following eight teams qualified for the final tournament. Initially, Kenya replaced Equatorial Guinea after they were disqualified by the CAF for fielding an ineligible player, but the decision was overturned on appeal, and Equatorial Guinea were reintegrated into the competition. Kenya appealed to the Court of Arbitration for Sport, but failed to overturn the decision.

Venues
The tournament was held in Accra and Cape Coast.

Squads

Each squad can contain a maximum of 21 players (Regulations Article 69).

Match officials
A total of 16 referees and 16 assistant referees were appointed for the tournament.

Draw
The draw for the final tournament was held on 21 October 2018, 19:00 GMT (UTC±0), at the Mövenpick Ambassador Hotel in Accra. The eight teams were drawn into two groups of four teams. The hosts Ghana were seeded in Group A and allocated to position A1, and the holders Nigeria were seeded in Group B and allocated to position B1. The remaining six teams were seeded based on their results in the last three editions of the Africa Women Cup of Nations, and drawn to any of the remaining three positions in each group.

Note: Kenya were initially included in the draw, but Equatorial Guinea were reinstated to the competition afterwards.

Group stage
The top two teams of each group advance to the semi-finals.

Tiebreakers
Teams are ranked according to points (3 points for a win, 1 point for a draw, 0 points for a loss), and if tied on points, the following tiebreaking criteria are applied, in the order given, to determine the rankings (Regulations Article 71):
Points in head-to-head matches among tied teams;
Goal difference in head-to-head matches among tied teams;
Goals scored in head-to-head matches among tied teams;
If more than two teams are tied, and after applying all head-to-head criteria above, a subset of teams are still tied, all head-to-head criteria above are reapplied exclusively to this subset of teams;
Goal difference in all group matches;
Goals scored in all group matches;
Drawing of lots.

All times are local, GMT (UTC±0).

Group A

Group B

Knockout stage
In the knockout stage, extra time and penalty shoot-out are used to decide the winner if necessary, except for the third place match where penalty shoot-out (no extra time) is used to decide the winner if necessary (Regulations Article 72).

Bracket

Semi-finals
Winners qualify for 2019 FIFA Women's World Cup.

Third place match
Winner qualifies for 2019 FIFA Women's World Cup.

Final

Goalscorers

Awards
The following awards were given at the conclusion of the tournament:

Qualified teams for FIFA Women's World Cup
The following three teams from CAF qualified for the 2019 FIFA Women's World Cup.

1 Bold indicates champions for that year. Italic indicates hosts for that year.

References

External links

Total Women's Africa Cup Of Nations, CAFonline.com

 
2018
Women Cup of Nations
2018 in women's association football
2017–18 in Ghanaian football
International association football competitions hosted by Ghana
2019 FIFA Women's World Cup qualification
November 2018 sports events in Africa
December 2018 sports events in Africa
Cameroon at the 2019 FIFA Women's World Cup
Nigeria at the 2019 FIFA Women's World Cup
South Africa at the 2019 FIFA Women's World Cup